Mismatch is a Bengali web series which started streaming on OTT platform hoichoi from 15 September 2018. This Bengali comedy web series is directed by Soumik Chattopadhyay, later on which was also dubbed in Hindi. In season 1, the series starring Rachel White who made her debut through this web series. The series also starring Mainak Banerjee, Rajdeep Gupta & Supurna Malakar in the lead roles.  In season 2 the cast remains the same except Riya Sen, who made her debut in Bengali web series through this web series.
On 18 September 2020, hoichoi released the third season of Mismatch with brand new five episodes.

The story is all about partner swapping. Marriages are not always happy for many individuals, hence, to end this marital conflict the couples decided to swap their partners. Do they really swap their partners?

Cast 
Riya Sen
Rachel White
Payel Sarkar
Abhishek Singh
Mainak Banerjee
Rajdeep Gupta
Supurna Malakar

Overview

Season 1 (2018)
The first season of the web series started streaming from 15 September 2018 with six episodes.

Episodes

Season 2 (2019)
The season 2 the series started streaming on 3 May 2019 with brand new 5 episodes.

Episodes

Season 3 (2020)
On 18 September 2020 hoichoi released the third season of Mismatch with five new episodes.

Episodes

References

External links

Indian web series
2017 web series debuts
Bengali-language web series
Hoichoi original programming